Joseph Walter Northrop (1860–1940) was an American architect.

He practiced in Bridgeport, Connecticut and was prominent in that city in the late 19th and early 20th centuries.  Northrop was born in New Haven on July 8, 1860.  In 1882 he moved to Hartford where he worked for architect George Keller.  In 1885 he relocated to Bridgeport to open his own office.  He married Mary Alvira (Ogden) Northrop.  He had a son, Joseph W. Northrop, Jr. (b. 1886), who would go on to be a prominent architect in Houston, Texas.  Northrop died in Bridgeport May 24, 1940.

Architectural works

Bridgeport, Connecticut
 Isaac W. Birdseye House, 733 Fairfield Ave. (1886) - Demolished
 Charles G. Downs House, 127 Broad St. (1887) - Demolished
 George Comstock House, 239 Park Ave. (1887) - still extant at the corner of Park Ave and Atlantic St
 Benjamin F. Squire House, 1601 Fairfield Ave. (1888–89) - Altered
 Edward W. Marsh House, 984 Fairfield Ave. (1888) - Demolished
 Frank Ashley Wilmot, Sr. House (President of American Tube & Stamping Mfg. Co.-formerly Wilmot & Hobbs Mfg. Co.) (1865-1915), 633 Clinton Ave. (1889) 'Stratfield Historic District' 'Number 3 in a series titled "Our Attractive Homes", published weekly in Bridgeport Standard; appeared 31 January 1891.' Currently (2017) used as office of Dr. James Caserta, DDS
 Willis F. Hobbs House (President of The Bridgeport Hardware Manufacturing Co.) (1854-1939) (Brother in Law of Frank Ashley Wilmot, Sr.), 579 Clinton Ave. (originally 303 Clinton Ave.) (1891) - Altered
 Thomas C. Wordin House, 1139 Fairfield Ave. (1892) - Now home to the local union of the Teamsters
 First Baptist Church, 126 Washington Ave. (1893–94)
 Thomas C. Wordin House, 33 Yale St. (1893) - An investment property. Altered
 Edward W. Harral House, 123 Harrison St. (1899) - Demolished. Currently the corner of Golden Hill & Lafayette
 Second Baptist Church, 774 Kossuth St. (1902)
 Burroughs Home for Women, 2470 Fairfield Ave. (1903) - Now the Burroughs Community Center
 Remodeling of Bridgeport City Hall, 202 State St. (1905) - No longer the city hall
 William R. Webster House, 208 Brooklawn Ave. (1906)
 Maplewood Avenue School Annex, 434 Maplewood Ave. (1908)
 Richard I. Neithercut House, 180 Brooklawn Ave. (1908)
 George T. Hatheway House, 800 Clinton Ave. (1910)
 Henry C. Stevenson House, 57 Coleman St. (1912)
 Read School, North Ave. between Garland & Reamer Sts. (1914) - Demolished
 Edwin M. Jennings Co. Building, 2 Lafayette Square(1919) - Altered beyond recognition
 Stone Bridge, Beardsley Park(1921) - Connects Bunnell Island to the park mainland
 Summerfield M. E. Church, 110 Clermont Ave. (1922)
 D. M. Read Co. Department Store, 1142 Broad St. (1924–25) - In association with architects and engineers Monks & Johnson of Boston.
 Golden Hill Apartments, 225 Golden Hill St. (1925)
 Shelton (Cambridge) Apartments, 2209 Main St. (1931–32)

Other locations
 St. John's Episcopal Church, 23 Main St., Essex, Connecticut (1897)
 Essex Public Library, 3 S. Main St., Essex, Connecticut (1898) - No longer used as the library
 Mary Taylor Memorial M. E. Church, 168 S. Broad St., Milford, Connecticut (1892)
 Taylor Memorial Library, 5 Broad St., Milford, Connecticut (1894) - Now home to the Milford Chamber of Commerce.
 Lauralton Hall, 200 High St., Milford, Connecticut (1897) - Built as the estate of Charles H. Pond in 1864. Henry A. Taylor had Northrop redesign the entire house. Now a girls' catholic school
 Colin M. Ingersoll House, 475 Whitney Ave., New Haven, Connecticut (1896) - Described as a "knowledgeable variant of the Chateauesque mansions of Richard Morris Hunt"
 Lexington Tower, 369 Lexington Ave., New York, New York (1926)
 First Reformed Church, 35 S. Broadway, Yonkers, New York (1894) - Demolished
 St. Paul's Episcopal Church, 20 Fair St., Nantucket, Massachusetts (1901–02)

References

Architects from New Haven, Connecticut
Architects from Bridgeport, Connecticut
1860 births
1940 deaths
19th-century American architects